Joss Sackler (born Jaseleen A. Ruggles) is a fashion designer. She is also known for her marriage to David Sackler (of the Sackler family), whose father Richard Sackler was the chairman and president of Purdue Pharma, and oversaw its manufacturing of the  highly addictive opioid Oxycontin a leading drug in the opioid epidemic.

Early life
Sackler was born in 1984 to a Canadian diplomat and spent part of her childhood in Japan.

She attended graduate school in linguistics and wrote her dissertation on the risk assessment of violent threats made by the Mexican cartels.

Career
Sackler is best known for her public feud with Courtney Love in September 2019. Attempting to fill seats at her fashion show for her LBV brand, Sackler offered $100,000 to Love, a recovering opioid addict.

Sackler maintains that her brand has no connection to Purdue Pharma.

The brand has received negative reviews from fashion critics.

Personal life
Joss is currently married to David Sackler, son of Richard Sackler who was a key figure in the controversial development and marketing of Oxycontin at Purdue Pharma. David Sackler himself sat at the board of directors at Purdue Pharma.

Controversy
Joss Sackler along with the Sackler family have been criticized for their role in the Opioid epidemic in the United States.

In the Media
Vanity Fair described her and her husband David as "near pariahs."

John Oliver on Last Week Tonight's Episode 229 "Opioids III" covered the role the Sackler family has played in the Opioid epidemic in the United States and devoted a segment discussing Joss Sackler.

See also 
 Sackler family

References

1984 births
Living people
Sackler family
American billionaires
Wealth in the United States
Opioid epidemic
Drugs in the United States
Opioids in the United States